Lars Sederholm is a Swedish-British equestrian trainer. He is a former consultant head of training for the British Showjumping Association.

There have been at least two of Sederholm's pupils at every Olympic, World, and European Championship in horse trials since 1962. He has been involved with the training of teams for the Olympic Games for four nations, has trained international show jumpers, three-day eventers, Grand Prix dressage riders and horses, racehorses, and judges.

For some time, Sederholm was based in Oxfordshire at the Waterstock Horse Training Centre.

References

Show jumping trainers
Dressage trainers
Living people
Year of birth missing (living people)
Swedish male equestrians
Swedish expatriates in the United Kingdom